The Directors' Fortnight is an independent selection of the Cannes Film Festival. It was started in 1969 by the French Directors Guild after the events of May 1968 resulted in cancellation of the Cannes festival as an act of solidarity with striking workers.

The Directors' Fortnight showcases a programme of shorts and feature films and documentaries worldwide.

Artistic directors
Programming is overseen by an artistic director. The current artistic director is Paolo Moretti who has programmed Director's Fortnight since 2018.

 – 1969–1999
 – 1999–2003
Olivier Père – 2004–2009
Frédéric Boyer – 2009–2011
 – 2012–2018
 – 2018–

Awards
Art Cinema Award
SACD Prize
Europa Cinemas Label Award
Illy Prize

References

Bibliography
 Pierre-Henri Deleau: La Quinzaine des réalisateurs à Cannes: Cinéma en liberté : 1969-1993 (Broché),  Editions de La Martinière, 1993
 Olivier Thévenin: Sociologie d'une institution cinématographique : La S.R.F. et la Quinzaine des réalisateurs (Broché), Paris: l'Harmattan, 2009,

Documentaries
40x15.Les Quarante Ans de la Quinzaine des Réalisateurs, directed by Olivier Jahan, 97 min, 2008 details

External links
Directors' Fortnight official website
Scott Foundas - A Brief History of the Directors' Fortnight

Recurring events established in 1969
Cannes Film Festival